Evgenia Grebenyuk (born 10 February 1988) is a Russian former professional tennis player.

Grebenyuk has career-high WTA rankings of 238 in singles, achieved on 11 June 2007, and 238 in doubles, set on 24 March 2008. She has won 1 singles titles on the ITF Women's Circuit. 

Grebenyuk made her only WTA Tour main draw appearance at the 2008 İstanbul Cup, partnering Czech Veronika Chvojková in the doubles. But First Round lost American Jill Craybas and Belarusian Olga Govortsova.

ITF Finals

Singles (1 titles, 0 runner–ups)

ITF junior results

Singles (2–3)

Doubles (0–4)

References

External links
 
 

1988 births
Living people
Russian female tennis players
21st-century Russian women
20th-century Russian women